Alberto Jara Franzoy (27 July 1929 – 5 September 2019) was a Chilean Roman Catholic bishop.

Jara Franzoy was born in Chile and was ordained to the priesthood in 1962. He served as bishop of the Roman Catholic Diocese of Chillán, Chile, from 1982 to 2006.

Notes

1929 births
2019 deaths
20th-century Roman Catholic bishops in Chile
21st-century Roman Catholic bishops in Chile
Roman Catholic bishops of Chillán